Orniac is a commune in the department of Lot in the Occitanie Region of south-western France.

See also
Communes of the Lot department

References

Communes of Lot (department)